Atik Ali Pasha Mosque may refer to one of two mosques built in the Fatih district of Istanbul, Turkey by the late 15th- and early 16th-century Ottoman statesman Hadım Atik Ali Pasha:

 Gazi Atik Ali Pasha Mosque, in the Çemberlitaş neighborhood
 Vasat Atik Ali Pasha Mosque, in the Karagümrük neighborhood

See also
 Atik Valide Mosque

Ottoman mosques in Istanbul
Mosques in Turkey